John Forsen is a Producer/Director from Seattle, Washington. He graduated from Western WA University in 1981.  He has worked for PBS, KIRO TV and started MagicHour Films.   In 2006 he produced the award-winning film Expiration Date. In 2009 he directed and produced the documentary "AYP, Seattle's Forgotten World's Fair", about the 1909 Alaska Yukon Pacific Exposition held on the newly formed University of Washington Campus. He has won 15 Emmys.  Currently he is partners in Fidget.tv

The Emmy winning 2010 documentary "Violin Masters; Two Gentlemen of Cremona" will start a national PBS release May 1, 2012 for a 3-year schedule.
2015 The documentary about the Pilchuck Glass School in Stanwood WA is airing on PBS nationally.  This school was started by glass artist Dale Chihuly. The 2020 Production of "Song of Rapa Nui", told a fascinating story about Mahani Teave who grew up on Rapa Nui (Easter Island) and left at age 9 to pursue her dream of being classical pianist—a journey that takes her from mainland Chile to The Cleveland Music Institute to Berlin and the great concert halls of Europe.  At the age of 30, on the brink of international success, Teave gives up her career to pursue a new dream, coming back full circle to Rapa Nui to found a free music school for the island’s children. The resulting school—named Toki, after the basalt tool once used to shape Easter Island’s iconic sculptures—is a model of sustainability, incorporating tons of tires, bottles and Pacific Ocean plastic; surrounded by agri-environmental gardens to grow food. With Toki, Mahani hopes to shape a bold new future for Rapa Nui and inspire hope and change on Earth, our island home. This is airing on Amazon Prime.

Filmography
2020 Song of Rapa Nui (documentary) (Producer/Director) 2021 Emmy nominated
2020 Lino Tagliapietrea: The Making of a Maestro (documentary) (Producer/Director)
2019 Tip Toland, Empathy in Clay (documentary short) (Producer) 2020 Emmy nominated
2015 Pilchuck, A Dance with Fire (documentary) (Producer/Director) winner 2016 Emmy "Best Historical" Documentary
2015 "Z. Z. Wei, At One in the Landscape, an artists journey" (documentary)  (Producer/Director)
2013 Transcendence, A Meeting of Greats.  Miro Quartet plays Schubert (Producer/Director) 2014 Emmy winner best Director
2012 All-Star Orchestra, 8) part 1 hour PBS special (TV series) (Producer) winner 2013 Emmy "Live Event coverage, other than sports" NY
2011 Julie Speidel, Perfect Edge (short) (producer/director)
2010 Violin Masters: Two Gentlemen of Cremona (documentary) (producer/director) winner 2012 Emmy "Best Historical" Documentary
2009 Given to Walk (short) (producer)
2009 AYP Seattle's Forgotten World's Fair (TV documentary) (producer/director) (Emmy nomination)
2009 Homage (video) (Emmy, best Director)
2008 Live from the Artists Den (TV series) (producer/director- 1 episode)
2007 Paul Marioni: Artist (short) (producer/director)
2006 Seattle Symphony from Benaroya Hall (TV movie) (producer/director) 200 Emmy winner, best live event coverage
2006 Expiration Date (film) (Producer) 
1997 HIstory of Glacier Bay (Documentary for the National Park Service) (Producer)
1987 50 Years of skiing in the NW. (TV Documentary) (Producer/Director)

References

External links
 
 Blockbuster: John Forsen Movies
 2010 Award
 46th annual Emmy nominations
 Violin Masters

Living people
Film producers from California
1958 births
People from Pasadena, California
Western Washington University alumni